Hough Springs (formerly, Hough's Mineral Springs) is a set of springs that was turned into a resort in the 19th century in Lake County, California.

Location

The springs are on the north shore of the north fork of Cache Creek at a point where the canyon widens into a flat several acres in extent, on a hillside near the hotel.
It is at an elevation of 1535 feet (468 m).

Springs

The two main springs were Soda,  and Iron and Magnesia, .
The Soda spring gave an excellent "seltzer" water with plenty of snap due to the large quantity of carbonic acid gas.
The well at the hotel was an "iron" water, and there was a White Sulphur spring in the creek bank below the hotel, that was not being used.

History

Originally a resort, which by 1910 could accommodate 100 guests. 
A post office operated at Hough Springs from 1882 to 1892, with a closure in 1886 to 1887.
The hotel, cottages and tents could accommodate about 150 visitors.
They were owned by the Bartels brothers.

The Bartels brothers located two claims on a deposit of mineral paint, found one a low spur off one of the higher mountain ridges, reached by trail from Hough Springs.
There were two colors lying beside each other, one a burnt umber and burnt sienna, and the other a slightly dark yellow ochre.
The material only needed to be  screened and bolted to prepare it for use as paint.

References

Sources

 > 

Springs of Lake County, California
1882 establishments in California
Resorts in Lake County, California